Chasmopodium is a genus of African plants in the grass family.

 Species
 Chasmopodium afzelii (Hack.) Stapf – Sierra Leone, Togo
 Chasmopodium caudatum (Hack.) Stapf – Benin, Burkina Faso, Ghana, Guinea, Guinea-Bissau, Ivory Coast, Liberia, Mali, Niger, Nigeria, Senegal, Sierra Leone, Togo, Central African Republic, Republic of the Congo, Democratic Republic of the Congo, Chad, Sudan, Angola

 Formerly included
 Chasmopodium purpurascens -  synonym of Rottboellia purpurascens

See also
 List of Poaceae genera

References

Poaceae genera
Andropogoneae